Schecter may refer to:

Solomon Schechter, rabbi, Biblical scholar
 Schecter Guitar Research, an American guitar manufacturer
 Schechter Poultry Corp. v. United States, a landmark Supreme Court decision regarding the Commerce Clause
 Jenny Schecter, a main character from the television show The L Word